Severe Tropical Storm Ma-on, known in the Philippines as Severe Tropical Storm Florita, was a tropical cyclone that impacted the Philippines in August 2022. The ninth named storm of the 2022 Pacific typhoon season, Ma-on originated as a disturbance over in the Pacific Ocean on August 18, and was upgraded to a tropical depression during the next day. The depression strengthened into a tropical storm receiving the name Ma-on, and became a severe tropical storm late on August 23 before making landfall in the Philippines. It would later make landfall in China and Vietnam on August 25. Ma-on weakened back to a tropical depression and due to unfavorable conditions it dissipated on August 26, 2022.

The storm caused moderate damage in the Philippines, China and Vietnam.

Meteorological history 

Deep convection associated with the disturbance strong low level persisted. Favourable environment for further development, being offset by warm sea surface temperatures of around 29–30 °C (84–86 °F). During August 19, the Japan Meteorological Agency
began tracking a low pressure in the Philippine Sea. The system moved westwards, eventually developing into a tropical depression on August 20. The Philippine Atmospheric, Geophysical and Astronomical Services Administration (PAGASA) began tracking the system, giving the local name Florita on August 21.

On the same day, the JTWC issued a Tropical Cyclone Formation Alert (TCFA) for the system. Shortly afterwards, the JTWC designated the system as 10W. Satellite imagery indicated that it had formative bands with a low-level circulation center (LLCC). By August 22, the JMA classified the system as a tropical storm and named the storm Ma-on. Later on, the JTWC and PAGASA also upgraded the system into a tropical storm. Ma-on began to moved slowly, under the influence of a subtropical ridge off the coast of Luzon. At 18:00 UTC, the JMA upgraded Ma-on to severe tropical storm status. The PAGASA reported that the system intensified into a severe tropical storm on August 23.

At that time, multispectral animated satellite imagery revealed a symmetrical central convection. Ma-on made landfall over Maconacon in the province of Isabela around 10:30 (PHT) (02:30 UTC). The system continued consolidating which allowed it to organized a small microwave eye. Traversing the Luzon Islands before it emerged over the coastal of Ilocos Norte.  Ma-on exited the Philippine Area of Responsibility at 05:00 PHT August 24 (21:00 UTC August 23). Upper-Level near the storm's center struggled to organize due to moderate to strong east-northeasterly shear. An Advanced Scatterometer (ASCAT) pass indicated that the storm was along the southern of the system. Ma-on moved west-northwest and subsequently made second landfall just southwest of Yangjiang, China on August 25. Shortly after the landfall, the JTWC discontinued warnings on the system.  Ma-on later become unfavorable of its intensity. As a result, the JMA downgraded the system to a tropical storm at 06:00 UTC that day. Ma-on moved west to the Gulf of Tonkin, and made third and final landfall in Móng Cái City, Quảng Ninh Province in Vietnam on 13:00 UTC. After that, JMA declared that Ma-on weakened to a tropical depression, until it was last noted in Northern Vietnam on August 26.

Preparations and impact

Philippines
Ahead of the storm's arrival, PAGASA placed the provinces of Aurora, Isabela and Cagayan under Tropical Cyclone Wind Signal (TCWS) #1 on August 21, 2022. During the next day, PAGASA raised TCWS #2 before TCWS #3 was ultimately issued and extended to include other parts of Luzon on August 23. President Bongbong Marcos suspended classes and government work in some areas in Luzon on August 23 and 24 just one day after the opening of full face-to-face classes, two years since the COVID-19 pandemic in the Philippines prompted schools to shift to distance or online learning.

The Department of Social Welfare and Development (DSWD) said that 16,654 food packs had been prepared. In Isabela, heavy rains brought by the storm caused four overflow bridges to be impassable. In Cagayan, 10,608 hectares of rice and corn farms were destroyed. In Pampanga, 39 barangays were flooded. In Cordillera, 1,882 search and rescue cop teams were placed on standby.

Power outages were reported in Northern Luzon. Flights from Manila to Bicol were cancelled due to inclement weather. The Philippine Army conducted disaster response operations. The Philippine Coast Guard (PCG) deployed 11 aluminum boats in Marikina City. According to the BJMP, 740 inmates were evacuated. The Metropolitan Manila Development Authority temporarily suspended their number coding scheme.

The NDRRMC reported 17,510 affected people, 4,330 were displaced. At least 4 people were dead, and another 4 were injured. Infrastructure damage was estimated to be ₱ (US$), while agricultural damage was estimated to be ₱ (US$).

Vietnam
In Vietnam, Ma-on caused multiple flooded and uprooted trees. 135,000 were planned to evacuate. Ma-on brought heavy rains; Dong Trieu received  and at least  in Dong Son. In total 321 households were flooded, with 38 households were deeply flooded in Uông Bí. So far, a total of 3 people were reported killed by the storm. 

Total damage in Tiên Yên District is 28 billion dong (US$1.18 million), while in Uông Bí is 11.7 billion dong (US$494,000). In Lang Son total damaged reached 10 billion dong (US$422,000), and in Bac Kan the damage is 4.25 billion dong (US$180,000).

Elsewhere 
In Laos, flash floods exacerbated by Ma-on. Villages along the Nam Ko river have been damaged. Thousands of people are reportedly affected.

Retirement 
After the season, the Typhoon Committee announced that the name Ma-on would be removed from the naming lists. Replacement names will be provided in 2024.

See also

Weather of 2022
Tropical cyclones in 2022
Typhoon Krovanh (2003) – a relatively strong typhoon which took a similar track.
Typhoon Hagupit (2008) – a much stronger typhoon that had a comparable path to Ma-on.
Typhoon Nesat (2011) – a much stronger typhoon which took a similar track.
Typhoon Kai-tak (2012) – a weak typhoon which had its track nearly repeated by Ma-on. 
Typhoon Kalmaegi (2014) – a minimal typhoon that had an identical path and affected the same areas.

References

External links

JMA General Information of Severe Tropical Storm Ma-on (2209) from Digital Typhoon
JMA Best Track Data (Graphics) of Severe Tropical Storm Ma-on (2209)
JTWC Best Track Data of Tropical Storm 10W (Ma-on)
10W.MA-ON from the U.S. Naval Research Laboratory

2022 meteorology
2022 Pacific typhoon season
2022 disasters in the Philippines
Tropical cyclones in 2022
August 2022 events in the Philippines
Typhoons in the Philippines
Western Pacific tropical storms
Typhoons in Laos